KXLT-FM (107.9 MHz, "107.9 Lite FM") is a commercial radio station licensed to Eagle, Idaho, and serving the Boise metropolitan area.  The station is owned by Townsquare Media with the license assigned to Townsquare License, LLC. It airs an adult contemporary radio format, switching to all Christmas music for much of November and December.

KXLT-FM has an effective radiated power (ERP) of 45,000 watts.  The tower is 818 meters (2684 feet) in height above average terrain (HAAT), giving it excellent coverage over much of Western Idaho, as well as part of Oregon.  The transmitter is off Shafer Butte Road in Horseshoe Bend, Idaho, among the towers for other Boise-area FM and TV stations.

History
While the station was still doing testing, it was assigned the KXLT-FM call sign by the Federal Communications Commission on August 26, 1994.  It signed on the air in September 1994.

On November 16, 2006, Clear Channel Communications planned to sell 448 of its radio stations outside the top 100 markets including KXLT-FM, along with Boise's sister stations including KSAS-FM, KCIX, KTMY (now KAWO), KIDO, and KFXD. In March 2007, Peak Broadcasting LLC bought the latter stations, making Boise one of the largest markets without any radio stations owned by the future iHeartMedia.

On August 30, 2013, a deal was announced in which Townsquare Media would purchase Peak Broadcasting's stations, including KXLT-FM. The deal was part of Cumulus Media's acquisition of Dial Global; Townsquare swapped Peak's Fresno, California stations to Cumulus for its stations in Dubuque, Iowa and Poughkeepsie, New York.  Peak, Townsquare, and Dial Global are all controlled by Oaktree Capital Management. The sale to Townsquare was completed on November 14, 2013.

References

External links
KXLT-FM official website

XLT
Mainstream adult contemporary radio stations in the United States
Radio stations established in 1994
Townsquare Media radio stations
1994 establishments in Idaho